The 2022 season was Sandefjord's third consecutive year in the top flight now known as Eliteserien, a record in the club's history. They participated in Eliteserien and the Cup. In the end, Sandefjord finished at 14th place but won relegation play-offs against Kongsvinger.

Squad

Out on loan

Transfers

Winter

In:

 
 
 
 
 
 
 
 

Out:

Summer

In:

Out:

Friendlies

Competitions

Eliteserien

Results summary

Results by round

Results

Table

Relegation play-offs

The 14th-placed team in Eliteserien will face the winners of the First Division promotion play-offs over two legs to decide who will play in Eliteserien next season.

Sandefjord won 5–2 on aggregate and both teams remained in their respective leagues.

Norwegian Cup

Squad statistics

Appearances and goals

|-
|colspan="14"|Players away from Sandefjord on loan:
|-

|-
|colspan="14"|Players who left Sandefjord during the season:
|-

|-
|}

Disciplinary record

References

2022
Sandefjord